The shortlisted nominees for the 2012 Governor General's Awards for Literary Merit were announced on October 11, and the winners were announced on November 13.

English

French

References

External links
Governor General's Awards

Governor General's Awards
Governor General's Awards
Governor General's Awards